PTV is an Australian television station licensed to, and serving the regions surrounding Mildura in Australia. The station commenced transmissions in 1997, when Prime Television won the second television licence for Mildura, a non-aggregated market, in competition with WIN Television.

Analogue transmission ceased on 30 June 2010 as part of the national conversion to digital television.

Seven News 

In the Mildura regional market, short two-minute updates are presented by rotating presenters with weather forecasts presented by Karl Lijnders, Daniel Gibson or Craig Moore. Some of the reports aired in these updates are drawn on the resources of Mildura-based WIN News operation.

See also
Regional television in Australia
Channel Seven

References

Prime Media Group
Seven Network
Television channels and stations established in 1997
Mildura